Julian Thompson may refer to:

 Julian Thompson (cricketer) (born 1968), former cricketer
 Julian Thompson (Royal Marines officer) (born 1934), military historian and former Royal Marines officer
 Julian Ogilvie Thompson (born 1934), South African businessman